The Owatonna People's Press is published daily in Owatonna, Minnesota and surrounding communities. The Owatonna Area Shopper is also published in and around Owatonna.

Publishers
The Owatonna People's Press is published by Adams Publishing Group Inc.,
Coon Rapids, Minn. and is printed in Princeton, Minn. Once a respected 7-day-a-week publication, the newspaper has reduced its frequency to four days a week (as of February 2021), transitioned to afternoon delivery and has regionalized coverage. These moves have caused significant pushback within the tightknit community of roughly 29,000 people and driven circulation well below its peak years.

See also
 List of newspapers in Minnesota

References

Newspapers published in Minnesota